The  was an infantry division of the Imperial Japanese Army. It was formed 28 February 1945 in Kurume, Fukuoka as a square division. It was a part of the 16 simultaneously created divisions batch numbering from 140th to 160th.

Action
The 156th division was assigned to 57th army. The division spent time from 5 May 1945 until surrender of Japan 15 August 1945 building a coastal defenses in Miyazaki Prefecture without engaging in actual combat. The 453rd infantry regiment was in Sumiyoshi (between Miyazaki and Shintomi), the 454th - in Miyazaki proper, 455th - in Kiyotake (on southern outskirts of Miyazaki), and 456th infantry regiment - in Kunitomi inland.

See also
 List of Japanese Infantry Divisions

Notes and references
This article incorporates material from Japanese Wikipedia page 第156師団 (日本軍), accessed 13 July 2016
 Madej, W. Victor, Japanese Armed Forces Order of Battle, 1937–1945 [2 vols], Allentown, PA: 1981.

Japanese World War II divisions
Infantry divisions of Japan
Military units and formations established in 1945
Military units and formations disestablished in 1945
1945 establishments in Japan
1945 disestablishments in Japan